The Saskatoon freezing deaths were a series of suspicious deaths of Indigenous Canadians in and immediately outside of Saskatoon, Saskatchewan, in the 1990s and early 2000s, which were confirmed to have been caused by members of the Saskatoon Police Service. The police officers would arrest Indigenous people, usually men, for alleged drunkenness and/or disorderly behaviour, sometimes without cause. The officers would then drive them to the outskirts of the city at night in the winter, and abandon them, leaving them stranded in sub-zero temperatures.  

The practice was known as taking Indigenous people for "starlight tours" and dates back to at least 1976. As of 2021, despite convictions for related offences, no Saskatoon police officer has been convicted specifically for having caused freezing deaths.

Incidents 
Victims who died from hypothermia include Rodney Naistus, Lawrence Wegner, and Neil Stonechild. Naistus and Wegner died in 2000, and their bodies were discovered on the outskirts of Saskatoon. Inquests in 2001 and 2002 into their deaths determined they were due to hypothermia. The inquest jury's recommendations all related to police policies and indigenous-police relations. Neil Stonechild's body was found on November 29, 1990, in a field outside Saskatoon, which had led to an Inquiry Into Matters Relating to the Death of Neil Stonechild. On the night of Stonechild's disappearance, five days prior on November 24, 1990, the temperature reached -28.1 Cº. The 2003 inquest could not determine the circumstances that led to his death.

In January 2000, Darrell Night was dropped off on the outskirts of Saskatoon but was able to call a taxi from the nearby Queen Elizabeth Power Station. The two officers involved, constables Dan Hatchen and Ken Munson of the Saskatoon Police Service, claimed they had simply given Night a ride home and dropped him off at his own request, but were convicted of unlawful confinement in September 2001 and sentenced to eight months in prison.

The Saskatoon police initially insisted these were isolated incidents. But in 2003, police chief Russell Sabo admitted that there was a possibility that the force had been dumping First Nations people outside the city for years, after revealing that in 1976 an officer was disciplined for taking an indigenous woman to the outskirts of the city and abandoning her there.

On April 21, 2018, Ken Thomas alleged that he was picked up by two Saskatoon Police officers and dropped off outside city limits at night in the cold. This accusation was investigated by the Public Complaints Commission, which stated that it was unfounded. In a news release, Saskatoon Police chief Troy Cooper said it was unlikely that there was contact on the night of April 21, 2018, between the police and Mr. Thomas, based on video and audio recordings taken from police cars.

Censorship attempts 
Between 2012 and 2016, the "Starlight tours" section of the Saskatoon Police Service's English Wikipedia article was deleted several times. An internal investigation revealed that two of the edits originated from a computer within the police service. Alyson Edwards, a spokesperson for the force denied that the removal of content was officially approved by the force. On March 31, 2016, the Saskatoon StarPhoenix reported that "Saskatoon police have confirmed that someone from inside the police department deleted references to 'Starlight tours' from the Wikipedia web page about the police force." According to the report, a "police spokeswoman acknowledged that the section on starlight tours had been deleted using a computer within the department, but said investigators were unable to pinpoint who did it." The police spokeswoman stated that the force is working to "move forward with all of the positive work that has been done, and continues to be done that came out of the Stonechild inquiry".

In media

Film 
These incidents have been addressed in two films. Darrell Night's experiences were documented in Tasha Hubbard's 2004 National Film Board of Canada documentary Two Worlds Colliding, winner of the Canada Award. A fictional incident was also portrayed in the half-hour drama Out in the Cold, directed by Colleen Murphy and starring Gordon Tootoosis, Matthew Strongeagle, and Erroll Kinistino.

Music 
In 2005, the Canadian punk rock band Propagandhi released the album Potemkin City Limits, including the song "The Bringer of Greater Things", which was "dedicated to Rodney Naistus, Neil Stonechild and Lawrence Wegner, murdered by members of the Saskatoon Police Department" (album liner notes).

Canadian musician Kris Demeanor's song "One Shoe" was written about the Saskatoon freezing deaths, particularly Stonechild's.
The Wailin' Jennys' song "Starlight" was also inspired by the freezing deaths.

In 2017, Mi'kmaq artist Cathy Elliott completed a five-weeks workshop with students from Sheridan College for her musical Starlight Tour. This work was commissioned by the Grand Theatre in London, Ontario in collaboration with Sheridan College's "Canadian Music Theatre Project".

Podcasts 
The freezing deaths are discussed in podcasts such as Criminal and Commons.

Television 

The Da Vinci's Inquest episode "The Sparkle Tour" involved the death of a Native activist, allegedly as a result of the police arresting, assaulting, and dumping him in the outskirts in the middle of the night without his shoes; the incident sparks discussion between investigators about the Saskatoon freezing deaths, which are referred to as "sparkle tours."

See also 

 Disappearances of Terrance Williams and Felipe Santos
 List of cases of police brutality in Canada
 Pinkenba Six
 Highway of Tears

References

Further reading 
 King, Thomas (2017). The inconvenient indian. A curious account of native people in North America. The illustrated edition. Doubleday Canada. . pp. 200–201 (First ed. 2013, without illustr.)

External links 
 "In Depth: Aboriginal Canadians: Starlight Tours", CBC News
 "Final Report – Commission of Inquiry Into Matters Relating to the Death of Neil Stonechild"
 "Conference confronts police ‘culture of oppression’", Aboriginal Multi-Media Society
 "Police Oversight", Justice Education Society and Centre for Education, Law, & Society at 

Police misconduct in Canada
Violence against Indigenous people in Canada
History of Saskatoon
Deaths from hypothermia
Crime in Saskatchewan
Police brutality in North America
Conflict-of-interest editing on Wikipedia